Svatobořice-Mistřín is a municipality in Hodonín District in the South Moravian Region of the Czech Republic. It has about 3,500 inhabitants.

Administrative parts
The municipality is made up of villages of Svatobořice and Mistřín.

Geography
It lies in the Kyjov Hills, on the Kyjovka River.

History
The first written mention of Mistřín is in a deed of King Ottokar I of Bohemia from 1228. Svatobořice was first mentioned in 1349, however it is probably older than Mistřín. The two formerly separate municipalities merged in 1964.

Sights
The landmark of Mistřín is the Church of the Visitation of the Virgin Mary. The construction of this Baroque chuch began in 1744 and was finished in 1769–1771, when the cemetery was established. It replaced an old Romanesque church.

In Svatobořice is the Svatobořice Castle. It was built after 1570, during the rule of the Morkovsky of Zástřizly family. The Kurucs burned the castle down in 1705, but it was rebuilt by the Serényi family. Today it is privately owned and inaccessible.

Notable people
Vladimír Vašíček (1919–2003), painter

References

External links

Villages in Hodonín District
Moravian Slovakia